is a railway station in the city of Ōmachi, Nagano, Japan, operated by East Japan Railway Company (JR East).

Lines
Kita-Ōmachi Station is served by the Ōito Line and is 34.0 kilometers from the terminus of the line at Matsumoto Station.

Station layout
The station consists of one ground-level side platform serving a single bi-directional track. The station is unattended.

History
Kita-Ōmachi Station opened on 20 July 1960. With the privatization of Japanese National Railways (JNR) on 1 April 1987, the station came under the control of JR East.

Surrounding area

See also
 List of railway stations in Japan

References

External links

 JR East station information 

Railway stations in Nagano Prefecture
Ōito Line
Railway stations in Japan opened in 1960
Stations of East Japan Railway Company
Ōmachi, Nagano